Flock Edit is a British independent out-of-house film editing company.

History 
Flock Edit was established in 2017.

Four of London's top young film editors teamed together to create a new out-of-house editing company. This unique new concept allows the film producers to edit their production in any location they want, without having to relocate to in-house edit facilities, potentially saving time and money, whilst keeping the creative process fluid.
As well as servicing the advertising industry Flock has also served the film industry. Recent films employing Flock and their techniques include Dunkirk, Edie, and My Pure Land.

The company began sourcing new talent and has grown exponentially, its editors winning numerous awards and nominations across the media industry. One of its films being selected as the British entry for Best Foreign Language Film at the 90th Academy awards.

The company also services the charity, music and advertising industries. Notably brands such as Apple, BMW, Vodafone, Unilever, Spotify and Age UK.

Previous film Projects 

 Dunkirk
 Edie
 My Pure Land
 A Song Called Hate
 The Offering
 Unlucky Plaza
 Trafficker

Previous advertisement projects 

 Age UK
 Apple
 Audi
 Avon
 Bacardi
 BMW
 Ford
 Lexus
 Rimmel
 RSPCA
 Spotify
 Unilever
 Vodafone
 Yves Saint Laurent

References

External links 

 Flock Edit Official Website
 Edie Film Website
 Unlucky Plaza Website
 Olly Stothert Website

Mass media companies of the United Kingdom
Mass media companies based in London
Television and film post-production companies
Film production companies of the United Kingdom
Film organisations in the United Kingdom